William Littleton Harris (1807–1868) was a Mississippi jurist.

Early life
Born in Elbert County, Georgia, in 1807, Harris graduated from the University of Georgia at the age of fifteen, and read law to be admitted to the bar.  His admission required an act of the legislature, due to his status as a minor.  Harris moved to Mississippi in 1837 and lived in Lowndes County, where he successfully established a large legal practice.

Career
Harris became as a circuit judge in 1853, and in 1856 helped write the Mississippi code of 1857.

In 1858 Harris was appointed by Governor John J. McRae to a seat on the Mississippi High Court of Errors and Appeals vacated by the resignation of Ephraim S. Fisher.

His best-known opinion was Mitchell v. Wells, decided in 1859.  The case prohibited a formerly enslaved woman from inheriting from the estate of her white father.

In essence, it held that once someone was a slave in Mississippi she would always be considered a slave, even though her father (and owner) had taken her to Ohio and freed her. The case illustrates the extreme southern position; it illustrates the uncompromising nature of southern law on the eve of Civil War.

In 1860 President James Buchanan tendered him the appointment to a seat on the Supreme Court of the United States, but Harris declined "because of the impending secession".

Civil War
Instead of taking a seat on the Supreme Court, Harris took a position as a commissioner, in which he was appointed by Georgia by Mississippi Governor, John J. Pettus.

Secession speech
On December 17, 1860, Harris delivered an address to the Georgia General Assembly, in Milledgeville, supporting secession:

The speech was so well received that one thousand copies of it were printed in pamphlet form.

Reconstruction
After the war his appointment to the High Court of Errors and Appeals of Mississippi was overthrown by president Andrew Johnson in 1867.

Later life and death
In response to the beginning of Reconstruction, Harris left Mississippi and moved to Memphis. He formed a law firm with judge Henry T. Ellett and Confederate Colonel James Phelan, Sr.

He died of pneumonia on November 27, 1868.

References

1807 births
1868 deaths
People from Lowndes County, Mississippi
University of Georgia alumni
Justices of the Mississippi Supreme Court
U.S. state supreme court judges admitted to the practice of law by reading law
19th-century American judges